The East African Currency Board (EACB) was established in 1919 to supply and oversee the currency of British colonies in British East Africa. It was established after Britain took control of mainland Tanzania from Germany at the end of World War I, and originally oversaw the territories of Uganda, Kenya, and Tanzania (excluding Zanzibar). Zanzibar joined the currency area in 1936. It operated out of premises at 4 Millbank, London SW1, one time the offices of the Crown Agents. 

For most of its existence, the EACB's main function was to maintain the local East African shilling at par with the British shilling. This was done by ensuring that the local currency was adequately backed by sterling securities. 

The East African Currency Board was replaced in 1966 by the independent central banks of these countries: Bank of Uganda, Central Bank of Kenya and Bank of Tanzania.

References 

 Arnaldo Mauri, The Currency Board and the rise of banking in East Africa, Dept. of Economics, University of Milano, WP n. 10/2007, in SSRN.

Former central banks
East Africa